Ned's Newt is an animated television series created by Andy Knight and Mike Burgess and is co-produced by Nelvana and German company TMO Film GmbH (later renamed as "TMO-Loonland Film GmbH" in seasons 2-3) in conjunction with Studio B Productions. It aired on Teletoon from October 17, 1997 to December 31, 1999. In the United States, the series aired on Fox Kids starting on February 7, 1998 on Saturday mornings, but later changed to weekday mornings on October 5, 1998 to January 1, 1999. However, only the first season aired on Fox Kids in the U.S. while the series was never rebroadcast for many years.

The series also aired on the now-defunct Qubo (with seasons 2-3) from March 28, 2016 to July 27, 2018, and again starting from March 30, 2020 to July 24, 2020. Teletoon Retro aired reruns of all 39 half-hour episodes on September 5, 2011 until it pulled off the air in early 2012.

Synopsis
The series begins with 9-year-old Ned Flemkin finally scraping up enough money to buy a pet. However, upon reaching the pet store, the only thing he can afford is a newt. Ned names his new pet Newton, but quickly tires it since Newton lies on the rock in his bowl. Complaining to the pet store owner that his new pet is not very active, the owner gives Ned a can of Zippo for Newt pet food but warns Ned not to give his pet too much. Ned feeds Newton a little, but Newton does nothing. Ned leaves the can beside Newton's bowl and goes to bed.

That night, Newton crawls from his bowl and gulps down several mouthfuls of Zippo. Thus, the eats too much warning comes true, Newton grows 6 feet tall, can talk (voiced by Harland Williams), and has the power to shapeshift. After Ned realizes this, he and Newton become the best of friends, but unfortunately, the effects of Zippo do not last forever. Newton often gets Ned into trouble, at which point the Zippo dissolves off. Newton shifts back to his small form, leaving Ned alone to convey the wrath of his parents.

The series recounts the misadventures of Ned attempting to live life normally while trying to keep Newton from being discovered.

Plot and themes
Each episode makes a habit of creating outrageous plots out of mundane tasks and settings. For example, after a fun weekend of playing, Ned exclaims he cannot wait for the next, but Newton suggests that they can build a time machine to relive the weekend. The idea soon leads to them accidentally being sent to the age of dinosaurs and altering the future. In another episode, to raise money for charity, Ned's friend Doogle digs a hole and stumbles across a race of subterranean trolls secretly planning domination of the world's metropolises-es.

Ned takes Newton everywhere and makes sure to keep some Zippo food with him at all times, just in case Newton turns back into a normal newt. Newton's powers almost always make things worse (mostly due to his poor understanding of society). Thus, when Ned explains that he's made a terrible mistake (such as giving 3.5 million dollars to some passersby), Newton and Ned must work together to put things right. And although they usually succeed in doing so, Newton invariably changes back to newt form just in time to avoid being seen and Ned to get into trouble.

The series made extensive references to famous faces and popular culture at the time, relying heavily on Harland Williams' experience as a comedian and impressionist. Newton shifts into newt versions of many celebrities in each episode, such as Arnold Schwarzenegger, Humphrey Bogart and Clark Gable for comic effect. Newton also frequently breaks the fourth wall, especially in season 3, even going so far as to comment upon how poorly drawn his belly-button was at one point or whether newts should have belly-buttons at all.

For the final four episodes of season 3, Harland Williams was replaced by Ron Pardo as the voice of Newton.

In the third season episode ("Rear Bus Window"), Newton proclaims his exact species name vittercensis, which is not a catalogued member of the genus.

Cast
 Harland Williams as Newton (episodes 1–35)
 Ron Pardo as Newton (episodes 36–39)
 Tracey Moore as Ned Flemkin
 Carolyn Scott as Sharon "Mom" Flemkin/Miss Bunn
 Peter Keleghan as Eric "Dad" Flemkin
 Jonathan Wilson as Rusty McCabe
 Tracy Ryan as Linda Bliss
 Colin O'Meara as Doogle Pluck
 Jim Milington as The Usual Guy (Pet Shop Owner)/Anklo

Selected credits
 Created by: Mike Burgess, Andy Knight
 Executive Producers:
Clive A. Smith
Patrick Loubert
Michael Hirsh
Andy Knight
Andrew Nicholls
Darrell Vickers
Peter Völkle
 Supervising Producers: Stephen Hodgins, Pamela Slavin
 Produced by: Vince Commisso, Patricia R. Burns, Blair Peters
 Directed by: Rick Marshall
 Voice Director: Debra Toffan
 Casting: Karen Goora
 Art Directors: Mike Ksunyoska, Trevor Bentley
 Design Supervisor: Steve Daye
 Music by: Pure West
 Produced with the Canadian Film & Video Production Tax Credit
 '(C) 1997/1998/1999 Nelvana Limited/TMO (Loonland) Film GmbH. All Rights Reserved.

Broadcast and home media
The series aired on Teletoon from October 17, 1997 to December 31, 1999 with reruns until the early 2000s. In the United States, the series aired on Fox Kids starting on February 7, 1998 on Saturday mornings, but later changed to weekday mornings on October 5, 1998 to January 1, 1999. However, only the first season aired on Fox Kids in the U.S. while the series was never rebroadcast for many years.

The series also aired on the now-defunct Qubo (with seasons 2-3) from March 28, 2016 to July 27, 2018, and again starting from March 30, 2020 to July 24, 2020. Teletoon Retro aired reruns of all 39 half-hour episodes on September 5, 2011 until it pulled off the air in early 2012.

Each VHS tape had two pairs of episodes. The first three VHS tapes, entitled "Home Alone with Newt", "Jurassic Joyride" and "Saturday Night Fervor" were released in the United States by Paramount Home Entertainment on March 23, 1999.Vol. 2, Jurassic Joyride The videos were duplicated in EP/SLP mode originally, so Paramount, the distributor of all three VHS tapes, changed the speed on future pressings of the first three tapes to SP mode. In Canada, the series was also released on VHS by Telegenic Entertainment.https://www.worldcat.org/title/jurassic-joyride/oclc/632004172&referer=brief_results 

As of 2022, the series is currently streaming on Tubi.

Critical response
Mainstream reviews of Ned's Newt ranged from mixed to mostly positive. Author and cartoonist Edward Gorey was a fan of the show, identifying Ned's Newt'' as the "greatest" animated show in a 1998 Newsday interview.

Notes

References

External links
 

1997 Canadian television series debuts
1999 Canadian television series endings
1997 German television series debuts
1999 German television series endings
1990s Canadian animated television series
1990s German animated television series
Canadian children's animated fantasy television series
German children's animated fantasy television series
English-language television shows
Television series about shapeshifting
Animated television series about children
Fox Kids
Qubo
Teletoon original programming
Television series by Nelvana
Animated television series about reptiles and amphibians